Sint Pieter (Saint Peter) is a neighbourhood in the city of Maastricht, in the Dutch province of Limburg. It is located on the western bank of the river Meuse, in the south of the city, and borders Belgium (both Flanders and Wallonia). It is a relatively affluent neighbourhood. 

Sint Pieter used to be a separate village, and was also a separate municipality until it merged with Maastricht in 1920. The municipality covered the village of Sint Pieter and the hill Sint-Pietersberg.

Trivia
 In common parlance, the neighbourhoods of Jekerdal, Villapark and Sint Pieter are all perceived as constituting Sint Pieter. 
 Sint Pieter is also the end of the famous Pieterpad.

References

External links
 Sint Pieter, Maastricht, Netherlands on Google Maps

Former municipalities of Limburg (Netherlands)
Neighbourhoods of Maastricht